Juan Carlos Ferrero was the defending champion but lost in the second round to Younes El Aynaoui.

Fabrice Santoro won in the final 6–4, 3–6, 6–3 against El Aynaoui.

Seeds
A champion seed is indicated in bold text while text in italics indicates the round in which that seed was eliminated.

  Juan Carlos Ferrero (second round, retired because of a pulled abductor)
  Yevgeny Kafelnikov (quarterfinals)
  Thomas Johansson (semifinals)
  Sébastien Grosjean (second round)
  Tim Henman (quarterfinals)
  Roger Federer (second round)
  Goran Ivanišević (first round)
  Jiří Novák (semifinals)

Draw

Qualifying

Qualifying seeds

Qualifiers

Qualifying draw

First qualifier

Second qualifier

Third qualifier

Fourth qualifier

References

External links
 2002 Dubai Tennis Championships Draw
 Main draw (ATP)
 Qualifying draw (ATP)

2002 Dubai Tennis Championships and Duty Free Women's Open
Singles